Darby is an English locational surname and has since become a given name. Its prefix derives from the Old Norse  ("deer"), and the suffix  ("farm"/"settlement"). The oldest recorded surname dates to the period of 1160–1182 in Lincolnshire. Darby was a common pre-1800 alternative spelling of Derby, a city in England. Notable people with the name or its variants include:

Surname

Darby
Abiah Darby (1716–1794), English minister
Abraham Darby I (1678–1717), British ironmaster and pioneer of coke-fired smelting
Abraham Darby II (1711–1763), British ironmaster, son of Abraham I
Abraham Darby III (1750–1791), British ironmaster, builder of the world's first iron bridge
Adrian Darby (born 1937), British environmentalist
Al Darby (born 1954), American football player
Alden Darby (born 1992), Canadian football defensive back
Angie Darby (born 1987), Australian modern pentathlete
Anthony Darby (born 1972), Australian footballer
Arthur Darby (1876–1960), British rugby union player
Brandon Darby (born 1976), American conservative blogger and activist
Brent Darby (1981–2011), American basketball player
Brett Darby (born 1983), English footballer
Byron Darby (born 1960), American football defensive end
Chris Darby (born 1950s), New Zealand politician in Auckland
Christopher Darby Griffith (1804–1885), British Member of parliament for Devizes
Chuck Darby (born 1975), American football player
Craig Darby (born 1972), American ice hockey center
Dick Darby (1919–1993), British Bishop of Sherwood
Douglas Darby (1910–1985), Australian politician
Drew Darby (born 1947), politician in Texas
Duane Darby (born 1973), English footballer
Edward Darby (1888–?), British World War I flying ace
Frank Darby (born 1997), American football player
George Darby (1720–1790), Anglo-Irish vice-admiral in the British Royal Navy
George Darby (baseball) (1869–1937), American baseball player
George Darby (politician) (1798–1877), British politician
Harry Darby (1895–1987), United States Senator
 J. N. Darby, a pen-name of American juvenile fiction writer Christine N. Govan (1897–1985)
 J. N. Darby, a pen-name of American author and naturalist Mary Q. Steele (1922–1992)
John Darby (NASCAR official), American NASCAR Cup Series race director
John Fletcher Darby (1803–1882), United States Congressman
John M. Darby (1804–1877), American botanist and academic
John Nelson Darby, British theologian, leader of the Plymouth Brethren, founder of the Darbyites and translator of the Darby Bible
Joseph Darby, American military policeman and whistleblower
Julian Darby (born 1967), English footballer
Kim Darby (born 1947), American actress
Mary Darby, maiden name of British poet Mary Robinson
Matthew Darby (born 1967), British conservationist and publisher
Newman Darby (1928–2016), American inventor
Rhys Darby (born 1974), New Zealand comedian and actor
Richard Darby, American attorney and judge; appointed Associate Justice of the Oklahoma Supreme Court in April 2018
Séamus Darby (born 1950), Irish Gaelic footballer
Sir Henry D'Esterre Darby (1750–1823), Anglo-Irish admiral in the British Royal Navy
Stephen Darby (born 1989), English footballer
Steve Darby (born 1955), English football coach and pundit
 Thomas Darby, inventor of the Darby Steam-Digger
Tom Darby, half of the country music duo Darby and Tarlton
William Darby (priest) (died 1791), Anglican Archdeacon in Ireland in the late nineteenth century
William J. Darby (1913–2001), American physician and nutrition scientist
William Orlando Darby (1911–1945), U.S. Army officer, commander of Darby's Rangers

D'Arby
Josie d'Arby (born 1972), British actress
Terence Trent D'Arby (born 1962), American singer-songwriter

Given name 

Darby Allin (born 1997), American wrestler
Darby Bailey, American actress, musician, songwriter, writer/producer, and businesswoman
Darby Bannard (1934–2016), American abstract painter
Darby Bergin (1826–1896), Ontario physician and political figure
Darby Berkhout (born 1966), Canadian rower
Darby Brown (1929–1988), Australian boxer of the 1940s and '50s
Darby Camp (born 2007), American actress
Darby Conley (born 1970), American cartoonist creator of Get Fuzzy
Darby Cottle (born 1961), American softball player
Darby Crash (1958–1980), American musician, from the band The Germs
 Darby Dougherty, American actress in the film Gummo
Darby Dunn, American journalist and reporter
Darby Field (1610–1649), British, first European to climb Mount Washington in New Hampshire
Darby Gould (born 1965), American vocalist
Darby Hendrickson (born 1972), American hockey player and coach
Darby Hinton (born 1957), American actor and filmmaker
Darby Jones (1910–1986), American actor
Darby Lloyd Rains (born 1948), American adult film performer
Darby Loudon (1897–1963), New Zealand-born rugby union player
Darby Lux II (1737–1795), American businessman, militiaman in the American Revolution
Darby McCarthy (born 1944), Australian jockey
Darby McDevitt (born 1975), American game developer and writer
Darby Mills, Canadian rock vocalist
Darby Nelson (1940 –2022), American writer and politician
Darby O'Brien (1863–1893), American baseball player
Darby Penney (1952–2021), American writer, activist
Darby Riordan (1888–1936), Australian politician
Darby Slick (born 1944), American guitarist and songwriter
Darby Stanchfield (born 1971), American film and television actress
Darby W. Betts (1912–1998), American Episcopal priest
Darby Walker (born 1974), Canadian ice hockey player

Fictional characters 

 Ernest Darby, on the television series Sons of Anarchy
 Daniel J. D'Arby, from the JoJo's Bizarre Adventure manga series
 Darby O'Gill, in the writings of Herminie Templeton Kavanagh
 Darby Carter, on the television series Love Life as portrayed by Anna Kendrick
 Darby Shaw, in the film The Pelican Brief played by Julia Roberts
 Darby, a character who replaced Christopher Robin in the animated television show, My Friends Tigger and Pooh

See also 
Arby (disambiguation)
Darby and Joan (disambiguation)

References 

English-language surnames
English toponymic surnames
English masculine given names
English-language feminine given names
English-language unisex given names